Suze-la-Rousse is a commune in the Drôme department in southeastern France, situated in the heart of the Rhône Valley vineyards

Location
It extends over the left bank of the river Lez and commands an uninterrupted view of the Mont Ventoux, the Lance mountains, and the foothills of the Dauphiné Alps. The neighbouring settlements are Bollène, Rochegude, Tulette, Sainte-Cécile-les-Vignes, Bouchet, La Baume-de-Transit, Solérieux et Saint-Restitut.

History
In  the Middle Ages, Suze-la-Rousse was the most  important  town of Tricastin. Suze castle was built in the 12th century by the princes of Orange on the site of a hunting  lodge given by Charlemagne to  his cousin Guillaume de Gellone. With its fortified medieval  walls, this fortress dominated the surrounding  area and guaranteed it occupants perfect security. During the Renaissance, the princes of Orange made it their country retreat.

Population

Wine
At the foot of the castle is the location  of the University  of Wine, a department of the University Institute of Valence. The facility, with its laboratories and tasting rooms is unique in  Europe, and offers courses in oenology, marketing, and management for the wine industry.

International relations
Suze-la-Rousse was twinned with  the town of Gouvy in  Belgium in  2003.

See also
Communes of the Drôme department

References

Communes of Drôme